Community gardens in New York City are urban green spaces created and cared for by city residents who are stewards of underutilized land. There are over 550 community gardens on city property, over 745 school gardens, over 100 gardens in land trusts, and over 700 gardens at public housing developments throughout New York City.

History 

In the 1960s and 1970s, New York City was experiencing a fiscal crisis and disinvestment resulting from white flight, bankruptcy, and corruption. Buildings were abandoned or allowed to fall into disrepair throughout the city. The city then claimed these properties when they defaulted on their loans and were often destroyed through demolition, decay and arson which led to vacant spaces gardens would later claim. During this time, roughly 11,000 vacant lots transferred from private to public ownership. Neighborhood residents began to create gardens on this vacant land which weren't city sanctioned and without government assistance. In 1962, one of the first gardens, El Jardín del Paraíso, was formed by Puerto Rican residents in the Lower East Side.

In 1962, the New York City Housing Authority (NYCHA) started the Citywide Resident Garden Competition, providing resources to NYCHA residents to see who could grow the best gardens. The program has since been renamed as the Garden and Greening Awards Competition.

In 1973, the Green Guerillas were formed and begun to throw “seed green-aids” to beautify vacant lots. They eventually turned their attention to a vacant lot at Bowery and Houston Streets which became the Liz Christy Garden, the first city-sanctioned community garden in 1974. After investing time as squatters, gardeners advocated for formal recognition and the Department of Parks and Recreation created GreenThumb in 1978 to provide resources and license community gardens. By 1985, there was an estimated 1,000 gardens in New York City.

In 1994, Mayor Rudy Giuliani was inducted after running on a platform of fighting crime, reducing homelessness, and privatizing public land and services. After declaring a housing crisis, Giuliani supported developing vacant lots, including ones with gardens citing the licenses with the gardens established them as interim-use spaces and would eventually be developed into housing. A majority of the proposed units were market rate, with only 20 percent available for moderate-income households. This created a controversy between the administration and city-greening advocates.

In January 1999, 114 gardens were put up for public auction without input from the community usually provided by the Uniform Land Use Review Procedure (ULURP). There were no use restrictions placed on these lots and local coalitions were formed in opposition staging demonstrations, participating in political events, utilizing formal approaches such as lawsuits, and built networks. 112 of the gardens were purchased by two land-trust organizations, New York Restoration Project and the Trust for Public Land. A second proposed sale of over 600 gardens included land use restrictions that developers needed to use some of the land for 'civic functions.' In 2000, the city sent bulldozers to level an unprotected Esperanza Garden, a community garden located in the Lower East Side which was founded in 1978. The leveling of the garden caused concern from the New York State Democratic Committee citing campaign contributions given to Giuliani during his campaign for mayor from the developer proposing to build on the site. Attorney General Eliot Spitzer also opposed the administration by recommending state environmental review or an act of the Legislature needed to happen before the sale of community gardens.

In 2002, Mayor Michael Bloomberg settled the lawsuit by Spitzer which preserved 500 gardens by placing them in the jurisdiction of City agencies, leaving approximately 150 gardens open for development. The success of the preservation of the gardens is due to re-framing the conflict as a quality of life issue rather than housing vs. gardens argument. Gardeners also framed the threat of development as a threat to their communities citing gardens were a space where a diverse population was able to work together while building community and becoming a larger voice to the city together.

In early 2015, Mayor Bill de Blasio made plans to build housing on over 40 city-owned sites housing community gardens citing the need for affordable housing. These gardens had signed interim-use agreements with GreenThumb and city maps showed them as vacant spaces. The R.F.Q. to sell lots to developers for $1 was not made publicly and gardeners found out about the initiative through 596 Acres, a non-profit who maps open city land and advocates for community uses. In January 2016, 36 of the gardens were conveyed into Parks Department to remain gardens.

Neighborhood context 

Community gardens exist within the context of their neighborhoods and struggle with the constant periods of gentrification, displacement, and development. These issues lead local residents to try to preserve these spaces of agricultural production, community, and ethnic expression. While much of these struggles take place outside the garden, issues of diversity also take place within the garden because of the views the gardeners themselves have of their stewardship. Gardeners view the garden in four different ways: a "patchwork of private property" when given a plot within the garden; prioritize visually pleasing green space; farm and agricultural needs; and community space focusing on issues of access to emphasize the interaction of people.

Research on social-ecological value 
A study of 35 community gardens in East Harlem found gardeners to have deep place-attachment to their gardens, with the community gardens also contributing to general sense of neighborhood pride. A case study of several New York City community gardens after Hurricane Sandy indicated that they served as a community of practice helping to support each other before and after the storm. New York City community gardens have also been shown to reduce storm water runoff due to pervious surfaces as well as raised beds and compost soil amendments. Finally, community gardens in the Bronx and East Harlem were found to harbor over 50 bee species, providing pollination for locally grown crops.

Gardening programs

GreenThumb 
GreenThumb is the program administered by the NYC Department of Parks and Recreation which provides resources and coordinates leases for city-owned vacant land. Originally called "Operation GreenThumb," it was formed in 1978 and was originally sponsored by the City Department of General Services. In 1984, 10-year leases for gardens were introduced. In 1988, GreenThumb expanded their work to provide support for school gardens and in 2010 founded the Grow to Learn program partnership with GrowNYC and the Mayors Fund which includes over 745 school gardens.

Today, GreenThumb is the largest urban gardening program in the United States supporting over 550 gardens and 20,000 garden members throughout the city. Most of its community gardens are a single lot, but add up to over 100 acres of public open space. GreenThumb provides resources including: soil, lumber, supplies, plant materials, and compost. Every year since 1984, GreenThumb holds the GrowTogether Conference for gardeners around the city.

To be in good standing with GreenThumb, garden groups must register every four years, sign the license agreement, provide keys to the gate, and submit the garden's bylaws. The license agreement includes posting signage, maintaining open hours, active membership, and the garden space; host public events; and assume risk. Chickens, bees, rabbits, and fish may all be kept in gardens.

Land trusts

New York Restoration Project 

New York Restoration Project (NYRP) was founded in 1995 by Bette Midler when the organization transformed a vacant lot into Highbridge Park in Upper Manhattan. In 1999, NYRP raised enough money to purchase and protect some of the gardens threatened by development by the Giuliani administration. NYRP currently owns and manages 52 community gardens throughout the city.

In 2007, NYRP worked with the Bloomberg administration to form MillionTreesNYC, whose goal was to plant a million trees in the five boroughs by 2017.

Brooklyn Queens Land Trust 
The Trust for Public Land (TPL) was formed in 1999 as a reaction to the Giuliani administration initiative to develop gardens into housing. In 2002, the TPL saved 69 gardens with a $3 million investment from the city. In 2004, the TPL was incorporated to become the Brooklyn Queens Land Trust (BQLT). The BQLT currently owns 35 community gardens in Brooklyn and Queens.

New York City Housing Authority 
New York City Housing Authority (NYCHA) is New York City's largest property owner and provides support for over 700 gardens throughout its 328 public housing developments. Since 1963, NYCHA has host its annual Garden and Greening Awards Competition for residents. It was inspired by Chicago's public housing and felt that a competition would encourage pride in their homes and a sense of community. Award winners are selected in every borough and citywide in categories including Best Flower Garden, Best Vegetable Garden and Best Children's Theme Garden.

In addition to its gardens, NYCHA has six farms on its properties. Farms are constructed and operated by 18-24 year-old residents who are Green City Force (GCF) AmeriCorps Members.

Community gardens in New York 

Full list of community gardens in New York

Former community gardens in New York 
Many community gardens in New York are bulldozed to make way for new construction. This new construction commonly leads to gentrification. These gardens include (but are not limited to):

References

Further reading

External links 

 GreenThumb
 New York Restoration Project
 Brooklyn Queens Land Trust

Community gardening in New York (state)
Culture of New York City
Community gardening in New York City